The Men's Over 50 field hockey tournament was one of four men's competitions played at the 2016 FIH Masters Hockey World Cup.

England won the tournament after defeating Australia 3–1 in the final. New Zealand won the bronze medal by defeating Germany 3–0 in the third and fourth place playoff.

Participating nations
Including the host nation, 8 teams participated in the tournament:

 (host nation)

Results

First round

Pool A

Pool B

Second round

References

2016 in Australian field hockey